Georgette Adjoavi Bellow (Tsévié, Togo, 1 January 1945 – 10 December 1973) better known as Bella Bellow was a Togolese singer, who created an international career and recorded several albums. She died at the age of 28 in a car accident in Togo.

She was born in Tsévié, Togo, to a Togolese father of Nigerian descent and a Ghanaian-origin mother. Bellow's first international performance was in 1966, when she represented Togo at the First World Festival of Negro Arts in Dakar, Senegal. Her first album, named Rockya, came out in 1969. In the album , she was accompanied by Camerounian band made up of Manu Dibango, on saxophone, keyboards and arrangement, Jeannot Madingué on bass, Slim Pezin on the guitar and Ben's on drums

She performed at the Paris Olympia and recorded with Manu Dibango.  Angélique Kidjo and Afia Mala have been influenced by Bella Bellow.

Discography

Albums
1968: Rockia live in Paris
1977: A compilation album of memories on Sonafric label, specializingin African music.

Songs
(Selective)
1968: "Zelié"
1968: "Bléwu" (Patience)
1968: "Nye dzi" (My Heart)
1968: "O senye" (My destiny)"
1969: "Rockia"
1969: "Bouyélé"
1969: "Bem bem"
1977: "Lafoulou"
1977: "Denyigban" (Motherland)

References 

1945 births
1973 deaths
Road incident deaths in Togo
Togolese people of Nigerian descent
Togolese people of Ghanaian descent
Togolese  women singers